Raja Ungu or Ratu Ungu (Thai: รายาอูงู) ruled the Sultanate of Patani (1624–1635), succeeding her sister Raja Biru.  In Malay, her name means the "purple queen." She was the third successive and last daughter of Sultan Mansur Shah to rule the country and was succeeded by her daughter Raja Kuning.

Reign
Raja Ungu was married to the king of Pahang. After the king died, Raja Biru send for her to return to Patani. When Raja Biru died around 1624, Raja Ungu succeeded her as ruler of Patani. Raja Ungu showed more antipathy towards the Siamese than her predecessors, and abandoned the title Siamese title peracau, using instead the title paduka syah alam ("her excellency ruler of the world"). She launched an attack on Siam with 3,000 men in 1624 and early 1625, which ended apparently successfully as Siam was said to have renounced claim on Patani. She married off her daughter (who later became Raja Kuning) to the ruler of Johor Sultan Abdul Jalil Shah III in 1632. However, her daughter was already married to the king of Bordelong (Phatthalung), Okphaya Déca, who then urged the Siamese to attack Patani.

Following the usurpation of the throne of Ayudhya by King Prasartthong in 1629, she also refused to send the bunga mas (golden flowers) which were typically sent as a sign of Patani's tributary status to Siam.  In 1632, Ayudhya sent an army south together with their ally in Ligor to quell her rebellion, but the attack was repulsed.  A subsequent attack by Siam in 1634 was supposed to be joined by the Dutch but the latter's ships arrived too late and again the attack failed.  Although Patani managed to repel the attacks, trade in Patani fell significantly. Finally in 1636, just following the death of Raja Ungu, a peace settlement was reached to restore relations between the two countries.

References

Further reading 
 A. Teeuw & D. K. Wyatt. Hikayat Patani: The Story of Patani. Bibliotheca Indonesica, 5. The Hague: Martinus Nijhoff, 1970.
 Ahmad Fathy al-Fatani. Pengantar Sejarah Patani. Alor Setar: Pustaka Darussalam, 1994.
 Wayne A. Bougas. The Kingdom of Patani: Between Thai and Malay Mandalas. Occasional Paper on the Malay World, no. 12. Selangor: Institut Alam dan Tamadun Melayu, Universiti Kebangsaan Malaysia, 1994.

1635 deaths
History of Pattani
17th-century women rulers
Sultans
Year of birth unknown